Slettringen Lighthouse is a coastal lighthouse in the municipality of Frøya in Trøndelag county, Norway. The lighthouse sits just off the coast of the village of Titran at the western tip of the large island of Frøya. It is Norway's tallest lighthouse. The lighthouse is lit from July 21 until May 16 each year. Although south of the Arctic Circle, it is not lit during the summer due to the white nights in Norway. The lighthouse is also equipped with a foghorn.

The  cylindrical, cast iron tower is painted red with a white base and two horizontal white stripes around it. The tower is attached to a two-story lighthouse keeper's house. It is a white light that flashes twice every 15 seconds. A first-order Fresnel lens has been in use since 1923. Part way up the tower, a secondary light is also located about  up the side of the tower. The secondary light is a white isophase light that is on for two seconds and off for two seconds.

The lighthouse was built in 1899 and it was automated in 1993. The lighthouse lost power in 2008, and the power supply was out for some time.

Media gallery

See also

 List of lighthouses in Norway
 Lighthouses in Norway

References

External links
 Norsk Fyrhistorisk Forening 

Lighthouses completed in 1899
Frøya, Trøndelag
Lighthouses in Trøndelag
1899 establishments in Norway